The National Lacrosse League Hall of Fame was established on June 16, 2005. The National Lacrosse League's board of governors will vote in the Hall of Fame members based on  the individual’s record, ability, integrity, sportsmanship, character and contributions to the team or teams that individual was affiliated with or the league. The league will also have contributions of journalists and broadcasters inducted into the Hall of Fame.

Currently, there is no building or location associated with the NLL Hall of Fame.

Members

Charter members
Inducted, February 23, 2006
Russ Cline 
Chris Fritz
Gary Gait
Paul Gait
Les Bartley

2007 Inductees
Inducted February 16, 2007
Tom Marechek
Darris Kilgour
Mike French
Tom Borrelli

2008 Inductees
Inducted February 28, 2008
Sal LoCascio
Johnny Mouradian
Tony Resch
Neil Stevens

2009 Inductees
Inducted March 7, 2009
Dallas Eliuk
Jim Veltman

2010 Inductees
''Inducted September 9, 2010
 Rich Kilgour
 Dan Stroup
 John Tucker

2011 Inductees
Bob Watson

2012 Inductees
Steve Dietrich

2013 Inductees
Pat O'Toole

2014 Inductees
Pat Coyle
Chris Hall

2015 Inductees
Terry Sanderson

2016 Inductees
Tracey Kelusky
Josh Sanderson
John Tavares

2021 Inductees
After a five-year hiatus, ten new members were inducted into the Hall of Fame in 2021.

Players
 Colin Doyle
 Kevin Finneran
 John Grant Jr.
 Casey Powell
 Shawn Williams
 Pat McCready
 Regy Thorpe
 Steve Toll

Officials
 Roy Condon
 Bill Fox

References

External links
Hall of Fame website
National Lacrosse League website

Awards established in 2005
Awards established in 2006
Lacrosse museums and halls of fame
Hall of Fame
Sports organizations established in 2005